Peddapalli is a town and Revenue Division in Peddapalli District in the Indian state of Telangana. It is the headquarters of the Peddapalli District and Peddapalli mandal. It is located about 197 kilometres (122 mi) North of the state capital Hyderabad, 36 kilometres (22 mi) from Karimnagar, 28 kilometres (17 mi) from Ramagundam. Peddapalli has a railway junction named PDPL which connects PDPL - KRMR - NZB railway line and New Delhi (NDLS) - Chennai Central (MAS) railway line. There are two trains that terminate here. Karimnagar Tirupati express rail engine changes to electric engine here. As of 2011 census of India, Peddapalli has a population of 41,171. In 2016 due to population Increase, the civic body of Peddapalli was upgraded from Nagar Panchayat to Municipal council Post upgradation to Council.

Geography 

Transport
Road

Peddapalli is well connected with Hyderabad - Karimnagar - Ramagundam (HKR) highway which is also called as Rajeev Rahadari or Telangana State Highway No.1. Peddapalli has no TSRTC bus depot but Godavarikhani (GDK), Manthani (MNTY) & Karimnagar (KRMR-2) bus depots operate dedicated services to the surrounding villages and other major cities. 

Rail
Railway Station Code: PDPL

Peddapalli has a railway station which is called as Peddapalli Railway Junction. It is operated by the Secunderabad Railway Division of South Central Railway (SCR). The station is located in the main line which connects New Delhi (NDLS) - Chennai Central (MAS) railway line. As a junction, it serves for Peddapalli (PDPL) - Nizamabad (NZB) railway line.  

Air

Airport Code 
IATA: RMD,
ICAO: VORG 

There is an Airstrip with 1,300 m runway which is located at Kesoram Cement Factory, BasanthNagar, Ramagundam. It is owned by the Birla Family and was operated by the Airports Authority of India. After the closure of Vayudoot it has not been of regular use. Now it is an unusual airstrip. The Government of Telangana is planning to develop this airport as a part of third airport in the state of Telangana by 2022 and it serves for four districts i.e. Peddapalli, Mancherial, Karimnagar and Jagtial.

Distance to Major towns and cities 

 Godavarikhani = 30 km
 Karimnagar = 37 km
 Manthani = 33 km
 Mancherial = 47 km
 Hyderabad = 198 km
 Warangal = 114 km
 Nizamabad = 162 km

Educational Institutions
There are many Educational Institutions in Peddapalli. It has Schools, Intermediate Colleges, Industrial Training Institutes, Engineering & Technology institutes, Degree & Post Graduation Colleges, etc. . .

Government Institutions (Major)

Schools

 Zilla Parishad High School for Girls
 Zilla Parishad High School for Boys

Junior Colleges

 Government Junior College for Boy's
 Government Junior College for Girls
Degree and Post Graduation Colleges

 Government Degree and Post Graduation College
Industrial Training Institutes

 Government Industrial Training Institute

Private Institutions (Major)

Schools

 Smart Kidz Paatashala
 Pallavi Model School
 Geetanjali Public School
 Indian Mission High School
 Krishnaveni Talent School
 St. Ann's High School
 Crescent High School
  Trinity Primary School
 Trinity Secondary School
Junior Colleges

 Vikas Junior College
 Gayatri Junior College
 Trinity Junior College
 Shreya Vocational Junior College
 Sri Chaitanya Vocational Junior College
Degree and Post Graduation Colleges

 Trinity Degree College
 Gayatri Degree and Post Graduation College

Engineering and Technology Colleges

 Trinity College Of Engineering and Technology
 Mother Teresa College Of Engineering and Technology

Industrial Training Institutes

 Sindhura Industrial Training Institute
 Shiva Sai Industrial Training Institute
 Kakatiya Industrial Training Institute

Other Colleges

 Trinity College Of Teacher Education
 Trinity College Of Pharmaceutical Sciences
 Sahaja School Of Business

Government and Politics 
Peddapalli Nagar Panchayat was constituted in 2011 with 20 election wards. It became the Municipality (Municipal Council Peddapalli) in 2016 due to the population increase & is constituted with the 36 wards in it.

Villages in Peddapalli Mandal  

 Andugulapalli
 Appannapet
 Bandhampalli
 Bojannapet
 Bompally
Brahmanpalli
 Chandapalli
 Cheekurai
 Cheemalapeta
 Goureddipet
 Gurrampalli
 Julapally
 Kanagarthi
 Kasulapalli
 Kotthapalli
 Maredugonda
 Mulasala
 Mutharam
 Nittoor
 Palthem
 Peddabonkur
 Peddakalvala
 Raghavapur
 Raginedu
 Rampalli
 Turkala Maddikunta

References 

Cities and towns in Peddapalli district